McMillian is a surname. Notable people with the surname include:

Audray McMillian (born 1962), American football player
Geraldine McMillian, American opera singer
Ja'Quan McMillian (born 2000), American football player
Jerron McMillian (born 1989), American football player
Jim McMillian (1948-2016), American basketball player
Lennie McMillian (born 1959), American-Irish basketball player
Mark McMillian (born 1970), American football player
Michael McMillian (born 1978), American actor and writer
Rodney McMillian (born 1969), American artist
Theodore McMillian (1919–2006), American judge
Walter McMillian, American pulpwood worker wrongfully convicted of murder and sentenced to death; exonerated from Death Row

See also
Hudson v. McMillian, United States Supreme Court case